This is a list of UCLA Bruins football seasons since the college's inception in 1919.

Seasons

Notes

See also
List of Pac-12 Conference football standings

References

Ucla
Football Seasons
UCLA Bruins football seasons